Shahid Abdollah (also Romanized as Shahīd ʿAbdollah) is a village in Karipey Rural District, Lalehabad District, Babol County, Mazandaran Province, Iran. At the 2006 census, its population was 331, in 86 families.

References 

Populated places in Babol County